Tampa is a city on the Gulf Coast of the U.S. state of Florida.

Tampa may also refer to:

Places

Australia
 Tampa, Western Australia, an abandoned town in the goldfields

Romania
 Tâmpa, Brașov, a mountain
 Tâmpa, a village in Băcia Commune, Hunedoara County
 Tâmpa, a village in Miercurea Nirajului, Mureș County
 Tâmpa, a tributary of the Mureș in Hunedoara County
 Tâmpa, a tributary of the Gropșoarele in Prahova County

United States
 Tampa Bay area, the Tampa-St. Petersburg-Clearwater, Florida, Metropolitan Statistical Area, sometimes referred to as "Tampa Bay"
 Tampa Bay, a body of water on the west coast of Florida at the center of the Tampa Bay area
 Tampa, Kansas, a small town near the center of the U.S. state of Kansas

Sports teams
 Tampa Bay Buccaneers of the National Football League
 Tampa Bay Lightning of the National Hockey League
 Tampa Bay Rays of Major League Baseball

Transportation
 Tampa (LACMTA station), an Orange Line station operated by the Los Angeles County Metropolitan Transportation Authority
 MV Tampa, a Norwegian cargo ship
 TAMPA Cargo (Transportes Aéreos Mercantiles Panamericanos S.A.), a cargo airline based in Medellín, Colombia

Other uses 
 Tampa (novel), a novel by Alissa Nutting published in 2013
 Tampa affair, an Australian political controversy and diplomatic dispute involving the MV Tampa in 2001
 Tampa, a genus of moths in the family Pyralidae
 "Tampa", a song by LANY from the album, LANY
 "Tampa", a song by Cico P
 University of Tampa, a private university located near downtown Tampa

See also
 Tempa (disambiguation)